Line 19 is an under construction subway line on the Shanghai Metro. Its termini are planned to be the Baoshan Railway station and the Hongjian Road station. It is planned to be  in length, with 34 stations. The line hopes to ease car congestion along Pudong South Road, as well as reduce crowding on the southern part of line 8, and the northern sections of lines 1 and 3.

The line was announced by the Municipal government in 2016 and is planned to finish construction in 2027.

History

Stations

Service routes

References

Shanghai Metro lines
Proposed buildings and structures in Shanghai
Shang